José Vitor Rodrigues da Silva dos Santos (born 28 April 1998), commonly known as Pernambuco, is a Brazilian footballer who plays as a winger for Sheriff Tiraspol, on loan from Lviv.

Career

Lviv
Pernambuco made his Ukrainian Premier League debut for Lviv on 23 February 2019 in a game against FC Chornomorets Odesa.

Bodø/Glimt
On 27 March 2021, he signed a loan deal with Norwegian club Bodø/Glimt. He could not join the club immediately due to Norway's closed borders as a preventative measure for the COVID-19 pandemic in the country. After one month, Pernambuco was granted permission to enter Norway, but a positive coronavirus test meant he could not leave Brazil and had to stay in isolation. He finally joined Bodø/Glimt on 28 May 2021. He made his Eliteserien debut for the club in a 2–0 win against Mjøndalen on 13 June 2021, coming on as a substitute in the 90th minute.

Career statistics

Honours
Dinamo Tbilisi
Erovnuli Liga: 2020

Bodø/Glimt
Eliteserien: 2021

Sheriff Tiraspol
Moldovan National Division: 2021–22
 Moldovan Cup: 2021–22

References

External links
 

1998 births
Sportspeople from Pernambuco
Living people
Brazilian footballers
Association football wingers
Associação Portuguesa de Desportos players
FC Lviv players
FC Dinamo Tbilisi players
FK Bodø/Glimt players
FC Sheriff Tiraspol players
Ukrainian Premier League players
Erovnuli Liga players
Eliteserien players
Moldovan Super Liga players
Brazilian expatriate footballers
Expatriate footballers in Ukraine
Brazilian expatriate sportspeople in Ukraine
Expatriate footballers in Georgia (country)
Brazilian expatriate sportspeople in Georgia (country)
Expatriate footballers in Norway
Brazilian expatriate sportspeople in Norway
Expatriate footballers in Moldova
Brazilian expatriate sportspeople in Moldova